In the last episode of Season 9 the presenters Zietlow and Hartwich announced that the show would return for a 10th anniversary season in January 2016.

In early August 2015 RTL broadcast a spin-off of the show called "Ich bin ein Star, lasst mich wieder rein" ("I am a celebrity, get me back in"), in which contestants of the nine original seasons competed against each other in order to get a chance to participate in the jubilee season. In total nine episodes and a final were shown, in which three contestants of each season took part. In the final the viewers selected the Queen of the Jungle of the 6th season Brigitte Nielsen to return to the show for the upcoming season. The other contestants were announced in early January 2016.

Some new rules were added to the original procedure. For the first time in the show's history 12 participants were announced to compete. The group of contestants was split into two camps with six participants living in each of the camps. Bushtucker duels took place instead of the original bushtucker trials. The season started off with a special on 15 January. Menderes Bağcı was announced as the winner and King of the Jungle of 30 January 2016.

Changes 
Participants were not housed in advance of the season together at the hotel Palazzo Versace, but individually in different ones, simple hostels to avoid arrangements. In the course of the candidate flew independently to Australia, and there were a contactless lock, which prohibits, contact via mobile phone.

Moreover, there were two camps, the  Base Camp  and the camp  Snake Rock  in the first three days, which competed in the bushtucker trials every day.

Contestants 
For the first time twelve instead of eleven candidates occurred against each other in 2016. Brigitte Nielsen, winner of sixth season in 2012, was for the second time in the jungle camp, after she won the show  I'm a Celebrity - Let me in again!  in the summer of 2015. Participants moved on 14 January 2016 Australian time to camp.

Results and elimination

 Indicates that the celebrity received the most votes from the public
 Indicates that the celebrity received the fewest votes and was eliminated immediately (no bottom two)
 Indicates that the celebrity was in the bottom two of the public vote

The Camps
At the beginning of the season saw the first two camps and thus the teams  Base Camp  and  Snake Rock . In the first episode, the candidates were allocated by the producers. The announced change of team assignment during the season has not been performed. While the team phase, the bushtucker trials were carried out as a duel, in which one of each camp fighting for star or food rations. Only the team of the winner got the earned number of rations, the losing team had to make do with rice and beans.

After three days in the Australian jungle, the camps were merged on 18 January. The candidates of the team  Snake Rock 'walked' in the well-known Camp, which was already used by the team  Base Camp '' since the beginning of the season.

Bushtucker Trials & Duels

Statistics

Ratings

References 

2016 German television seasons
10